Dara is a given name in several languages.

Dara, Daraa, or DARA may also refer to:

Geography

Africa 
 Dar'a, region in northern Ethiopia
 Dara (woreda), region in southern Ethiopia

Asia 
 Dara (Mesopotamia), an archeological site in Mardin province, Turkey
 Dara, Iran, a village in East Azerbaijan Province, Iran
 Daraa Governorate, province of Syria
 Daraa, capital city of the Daraa Governorate

Europe 
 Dara, Greece, community in Arcadia, Greece
 Dara, a village in Pietroasele Commune, Buzău County, Romania
 Dara, a village in Dorolț Commune, Satu Mare County, Romania
 Daranak, Armenia, also called Dara

Film and entertainment 
 Dara (film), a 2007 Indonesian short film
 Macabre (film), a 2009 Indonesian film based on the short film Dara
 Dara of Jasenovac a Serbian historical drama film
 Dara (game) West African strategy game

People 
 Dara clan, a clan of Jats in India
 Sandara Park, South Korean singer, actress and television presenter known as Dara
 Nicoleta Dara (born Nicoleta Darabană, 1993), Moldovan pop singer known as Dara
 Dara (Bulgarian singer), Bulgarian recording artist
 Dara (wrestler) (born 1969), Japanese professional wrestler known as Kaoru

First name
 Dara Murphy (born 1969), Irish politician
 Dara Nusserwanji Khurody (1906–1983), Indian dairy entrepreneur
 Dara Ó Briain (born 1972), Irish comedian and television presenter
 Dara Reneé, (born 2000), American actress
 Dara Shikoh, eldest son of Mughal emperor Shah Jahan
 Dara Singh, Indian actor and wrestler 
 Dara Torres (born 1967), American Olympic swimming champion
 Darashaw Nosherwan Wadia (1883–1969), Indian geologist
 Dara Khosrowshahi (born 1969), businessman and CEO of Uber

Family name
 Chan Dara (born 1986), Cambodian footballer
 Daoyod Dara (born 1954), Thai-Vietnamese football player
 DJ Dara (Darragh Guilfoyle), Irish drum and bass DJ in America
 Dur-e Najaf Dara (born 1945), Australian restaurateur
 Eszter Dara (born 1990), Hungarian swimmer
 Evan Dara, American novelist
 Isavella Dara, Greek and French model and beauty contestant
 Kazi Abdul Wadud Dara, Bangladeshi politician
 Olu Dara (born Charles Jones III, 1941) American cornetist, guitarist, and singer
 Sofia Dara (born 1963), Greek swimmer
 Virak Dara (born Kim Hiek, 1947), Cambodian actress

Other uses 
 Dara (fish), a West African species of grunt Parakuhlia macropthalma
 Dara River (disambiguation)
 Dara Academy, a school in Thailand
 MV Dara, an ocean liner
 Decreasing absolute risk aversion

Acronyms 
 DARA International, non-profit organization working to improve development aid and humanitarian aid
 Defence Aviation Repair Agency, in the United Kingdom
 Deutsche Agentur für Raumfahrtangelegenheiten, an agency that was merged into the German Aerospace Center

See also 
 Darragh